The Dominican Summer Blue Jays are a baseball team in the Dominican Summer League.  The DSL is a rookie level circuit, and therefore the team is a rookie affiliate. The team plays in the San Pedro de Macorís division.

Facilities

The team plays at Boca Chica Baseball City Complex along with Dominican Summer League Diamondbacks, Dominican Summer League Orioles, Dominican Summer League White Sox and Dominican Summer League Reds. The facility opened in 2004 and has 10 full baseball diamonds and two smaller diamonds.

Championships

DSL Blue Jays were league champions during the 1991 season. In 2021, when there was no postseason, the team had the league's best winning percentage for the regular season, at 38–19 (.667).

Roster

Results by season

2006
In 2006, the Blue Jays' one DSL team finished with a record of 44–29.

2007
In 2007, two teams were fielded, designated Blue Jays 1 and Blue Jays 2. Blue Jays 1 finished with a record of 35–33.

2008
In 2008, two teams were again fielded, playing in the Boca Chica South division. They played 72 games between the end of May until mid to late August with playoffs beginning at the end of August. The DSL All Star game held on July 27 included Blue Jay prospects catcher Carlos Pérez and infielder Oliver Dominguez. Blue Jays 1 ended with a record of 35–33,  finishing 4th in the group and 13 games behind the DSL Giants who were division champions.

2009
In 2009, the Blue Jays had one team, competing in the Boca Chica North Division, which finished the season at 43–26 and in fourth place, eight games behind the DSL Giants who again won the division.

2010
In 2010, the team moved into the San Pedro Division.

References

Baseball teams established in 2006
Dominican Summer League teams
Baseball teams in the Dominican Republic
Toronto Blue Jays minor league affiliates